Florida Christian School is a private, non-denominational Christian school in Olympia Heights, in unincorporated Miami-Dade County, Florida. The school offers co-ed classes from preschool through high school. Current enrollment exceeds 1,000 students.

History
Florida Christian School was founded in June 1968 as a Christian academy, at the time Dade County schools were integrating. In 2016, school enrollment was predominantly Hispanic, with twelve African American students (1%).

The school offers bulletproof inserts for student backpacks.  In the event of an active shooter situation, students are instructed to wear backpacks covering their chests.

Accreditation 
Florida Christian School is accredited by the Southern Association of Colleges and Schools (SACS), the Florida Association of Christian Colleges and Schools (FACCS) and the American Association of Christian Schools (AACS).

Athletics 
 Florida AA State baseball champions in 2004 and 2005 
 Florida AA State boys basketball champions in 1996

Notable alumni
 Ryan Jackson, Major League Baseball shortstop
 Octavio De La Grana, basketball coach
 Andre Wadsworth, NFL Player, NCAA National Champion

References

Sources
 List of SACS accredited schools in Florida
 Membership directory of AACS

Christian schools in Florida
Nondenominational Christian schools in the United States
High schools in Miami-Dade County, Florida
Private K-12 schools in Florida
Educational institutions established in 1968
1968 establishments in Florida